Vodka is a clear distilled alcoholic beverage. Different varieties originated in Poland, Russia, and Sweden. Vodka is composed mainly of water and ethanol but sometimes with traces of impurities and flavourings. Traditionally, it is made by distilling liquid from fermented cereal grains,  and potatoes since introduced in Europe in the 1700's. Some modern brands use corn, sugar cane, fruits, honey, and maple sap  as the base.

Since the 1890s, standard vodkas have been 40% alcohol by volume (ABV) (80 U.S. proof). The European Union has established a minimum alcohol content of 37.5% for vodka. Vodka in the United States must have a minimum alcohol content of 40%.

Vodka is traditionally drunk "neat" (not mixed with water, ice, or other mixers), and it is often served freezer chilled in the vodka belt of Belarus, Estonia, Finland, Iceland, Latvia, Lithuania, Norway, Poland, Russia, Sweden, and Ukraine. It is also used in cocktails and mixed drinks, such as the vodka martini, Cosmopolitan, vodka tonic, screwdriver, greyhound, Black or White Russian, Moscow mule, Bloody Mary, and Caesar.

Etymology
The name vodka is a diminutive form of the Slavic word voda (water), interpreted as "little water": root vod- [water] + -k- (diminutive suffix, among other functions) + -a (ending of feminine gender).

In English literature, the word vodka appeared in around the late 18th century. In a book of travels published in English in 1780 (presumably, a translation from German), Johann Gottlieb Georgi correctly explained that "kabak in the Russian language signifies a public house for the common people to drink vodka (a sort of brandy) in." William Tooke in 1799 glossed vodka as "rectified corn-spirits", using the traditional English sense of the word "corn"  to refer to any grain, not just maize. In French, Théophile Gautier in 1800 glossed it as a "grain liquor" served with meals in Poland (eau-de-vie de grain).

Another possible connection of vodka with "water" is the name of the medieval alcoholic beverage aqua vitae (Latin, literally, "water of life"), which is reflected in Polish okowita, Ukrainian , Belarusian , and Scandinavian akvavit. Whiskey has a similar etymology, from the Irish and Scottish Gaelic uisce beatha/uisge-beatha.

People in the area of vodka's probable origin have names for vodka with roots meaning "to burn": ; ; ; ;  is also in use, colloquially and in proverbs; ; . In Russian during the 17th and 18th centuries,  (goryashchee vino, "burning wine" or "hot wine") was widely used.

History

Scholars debate the beginnings of vodka because there is little historical material available. For many centuries, beverages differed significantly compared to the vodka of today, as the spirit at that time had a different flavor, color, and smell, and was originally used as medicine. It contained little alcohol, an estimated maximum of about 14%. 
Distillation techniques were developed in Roman Egypt by the 3rd century, but the description of aqua ardens ("burning water", i.e., alcohol) made by distilling wine with salt appears in Latin works only by the 12th century. The process was well known among European medieval chemists by about 1300.

Poland

The world's first written mention of the word wódka was in 1405 from Akta Grodzkie recorder of deeds, in the court documents from the Palatinate of Sandomierz in Poland. 
At the time, the word wódka referred to chemical compounds such as medicines and cosmetics' cleansers.
The production of liquor begins in the mid-15th century, with varied local traditions emerging throughout Europe, in  Poland as vodka ( or ). In the 16th century, the Polish word for the beverage was  gorzałka (from the Old Polish verb gorzeć meaning "to burn"), which is also the source of Ukrainian horilka (горілка). The word written in Cyrillic appeared first in 1533, about a medicinal drink brought from Poland to Russia by the Russian merchants.

In these early days, the spirits were used mostly as medicines. Stefan Falimierz asserted in his 1534 works on herbs that vodka could serve "to increase fertility and awaken lust". Wodka lub gorzałka (1614), by Jerzy Potański, contains valuable information on the production of vodka. Jakub Kazimierz Haur, in his book Skład albo skarbiec znakomitych sekretów ekonomii ziemiańskiej (A Treasury of Excellent Secrets about Landed Gentry's Economy, Kraków, 1693), gave detailed recipes for making vodka from rye.

Some Polish vodka blends go back centuries. Most notable are Żubrówka, from about the 16th century; Goldwasser, from the early 17th century; and aged Starka vodka, from the 16th century. In the mid-17th century, the szlachta (nobility of Poland) were granted a monopoly on producing and selling vodka in their territories. This privilege was a source of substantial profits. One of the most famous distilleries of the aristocracy was established by Princess Lubomirska and later operated by her grandson, Count Alfred Wojciech Potocki. The Vodka Industry Museum, located at the park of the Potocki country estate has an original document attesting that the distillery already existed in 1784. Today it operates as "Polmos Łańcut".

Vodka production on a much larger scale began in Poland at the end of the 16th century, initially at Kraków, whence spirits were exported to Silesia before 1550. Silesian cities also bought vodka from Poznań, a city that in 1580 had 498 working spirits distilleries. Soon, however, Gdańsk outpaced both these cities. In the 17th and 18th centuries, Polish vodka was known in the Netherlands, Denmark, England, Russia, Germany, Austria, Hungary, Romania, Ukraine, Bulgaria and the Black Sea basin.

Early production methods were rudimentary. The beverage was usually low-proof, and the distillation process had to be repeated several times (a three-stage distillation process was common). The first distillate was called brantówka, the second was szumówka, and the third was okowita (from aqua vitae), which generally contained 70–80% ABV. Then the beverage was watered down, yielding a simple vodka (30–35% ABV), or a stronger one if the watering was done using an alembic. The exact production methods were described in 1768 by Jan Paweł Biretowski and in 1774 by Jan Chryzostom Pasek. The late 18th century inaugurated the production of vodka from various unusual substances including even the carrot.

Though there was a substantial vodka cottage industry in Poland back to the 16th century, the end of the 18th century marked the start of real industrial production of vodka in Poland (Kresy, the eastern part of Poland was controlled by the Russian empire at that time). Vodkas produced by the nobility and clergy became a mass product. The first industrial distillery was opened in 1782 in Lwów by J. A. Baczewski. He was soon followed by Jakub Haberfeld, who in 1804 established a factory at Oświęcim, and by Hartwig Kantorowicz, who started producing Wyborowa in 1823 at Poznań. The implementation of new technologies in the latter half of the 19th century, which allowed the production of clear vodkas, contributed to their success. The first rectification distillery was established in 1871. In 1925, the production of clear vodkas was made a Polish government monopoly.

After World War II, all vodka distilleries were taken over by Poland's Marxist–Leninist government. During the martial law of the 1980s, the sale of vodka was rationed. Following the success of the Solidarity movement and the abolition of single-party rule in Poland, many distilleries began struggling financially. Some filed for bankruptcy, but many were privatized, leading to the creation of various new brands.

Russia

A type of distilled liquor designated by the Russian word vodka came to Russia in the late 14th century. In 1386, the Genoese ambassadors brought the first aqua vitae ("the water of life") to Moscow and presented it to Grand Duke Dmitry Donskoy. The liquid obtained by distillation of grape must was thought to be a concentrate and a "spirit" of wine (spiritus vini in Latin), whence came to the name of this substance in many European languages (like English spirit, or Russian).

According to a legend, around 1430, a monk named Isidore from Chudov Monastery inside the Moscow Kremlin made a recipe of the first Russian vodka. Having a special knowledge and distillation devices, he became the creator of a new, higher quality type of alcoholic beverage. This "bread wine", as it was initially known, was for a long time produced exclusively in the Grand Duchy of Moscow and in no other principality of Rus' (this situation persisted until the era of industrial production). Thus, this beverage was closely associated with Moscow.

Until the mid-18th century, the drink remained relatively low in alcohol content, not exceeding 40% ABV. Multiple terms for the drink were recorded, sometimes reflecting different levels of quality, alcohol concentration, filtering, and the number of distillations; most commonly, it was referred to as "burning wine", "bread wine", or even in some locations simply "wine". In some locations, grape wine may have been so expensive that it was a drink only for aristocrats. Burning wine was usually diluted with water to 24% ABV or less before drinking. It was mostly sold in taverns and was quite expensive. At the same time, the word vodka was already in use, but it described herbal tinctures (similar to Nalewka), containing up to 75% ABV, and made for medicinal purposes.

The first written usage of the word vodka in an official Russian document in its modern meaning is dated by the decree of Empress Elizabeth of 8 June 1751, which regulated the ownership of vodka distilleries. By the 1860s, a government policy of promoting the consumption of state-manufactured vodka made it the drink of choice for many Russians. In 1863, the government monopoly on vodka production was repealed, causing prices to plummet and making vodka available even to low-income citizens. The taxes on vodka became a key element of government finances in Tsarist Russia, providing at times up to 40% of state revenue. By 1911, vodka comprised 89% of all alcohol consumed in Russia. This level has fluctuated somewhat during the 20th century but remained quite high at all times. The most recent estimates put it at 70% (2001). Today, some popular Russian vodka producers or brands are (amongst others) Stolichnaya and Russian Standard.

During the late 1970s, Russian culinary author William Pokhlebkin compiled a history of the production of vodka in Russia, as part of the Soviet case in a trade dispute; this was later published as A History of Vodka. Pokhlebkin claimed that while there is a wealth of publications about the history of consumption and distribution of vodka, virtually nothing had been written about vodka production. One of his assertions was that the word "vodka" was used in popular speech in Russia considerably earlier than the middle of the 18th century, but the word did not appear in print until the 1860s. Pokhlebkin's sources were challenged by David Christian in the Slavic Review in 1994. Christian criticized the lack of valid references in Pokhlebkin's works stating that his work has an obvious pro-Russian bias. Pokhlebkin is also known for his Pan-Slavic sympathies under the leadership of Russia and sentiments that, in David Christian's opinion, discredit most of his work, especially his History of Vodka.

Sweden
Up until the 1950s, vodka was not used as a designation for Swedish distilled beverages, which were instead called brännvin ("burn-wine"), the word having the same etymology as the Dutch Brandewijn, which is the base for the word brandy. This beverage has been produced in Sweden since the late 15th century, although the total production was still small in the 17th century. From the early 18th century, production expanded, although production was prohibited several times, during grain shortages. Although initially a grain product, potatoes started to be used in the production in the late 18th century and became dominant from the early 19th century. From the early 1870s, distillery equipment was improved.

Progressively from the 1960s, unflavoured Swedish brännvin also came to be called vodka. The first Swedish product to use this term was Explorer Vodka, which was created in 1958 and initially was intended for the American export market. Although it ultimately failed to do so, it remains one of the most popular vodka brands in Sweden today. In 1979, Absolut Vodka was launched, reusing the name of the old Absolut Rent Brännvin ("absolutely pure brännvin") created in 1879.

After Sweden joined the European Union in 1995, the regulations were changed so that privately owned companies could produce Vodka.

Vodka has become popular among young people, with a flourishing black market. In 2013, the organizers of the so-called "vodka car" were jailed for two and a half years for having illegally provided thousands of liters to young people, some as young as 13.

Production

Vodka may be distilled from any starch- or sugar-rich plant matter; most vodka today is produced from grains such as sorghum, corn, rye or wheat. Among grain vodkas, rye and wheat vodkas are generally considered superior. Some vodkas are made from potatoes, molasses, soybeans, grapes, rice, sugar beets and sometimes even byproducts of oil refining or wood pulp processing. In some Central European countries, such as Poland, some vodka is produced by just fermenting a solution of crystal sugar and yeast. In the European Union there are talks about the standardization of vodka, and the Vodka Belt countries insist that only spirits produced from grains, potato and sugar beet molasses be allowed to be branded as "vodka", following the traditional methods of production.

In the United States, many vodkas are made from 95% pure grain alcohol produced in large quantities by agricultural-industrial giants Archer Daniels Midland, Grain Processing Corporation, and Midwest Grain Products (MGP). Bottlers purchase the base spirits in bulk, then filter, dilute, distribute and market the end product under a variety of vodka brand names. Similar methods are used in other regions such as Europe.

This pure grain alcohol, also known as rectified spirit, neutral spirit, or ethyl alcohol of agricultural origin is also available directly to consumers in some areas, as products such as Everclear, Polmos spirytus rektyfikowany, and others. In contrast to very-high ABV vodkas such as the Bulgarian Balkan 176° with 88% ABV, these grain alcohol products are not considered vodka; they have not (yet) gone through the filtration and refining process used to produce vodka.

A study conducted on NPR's Planet Money podcast revealed negligible differences in taste between various brands of vodka, leading to speculation as to how much branding contributes to the concept of "super-premium vodkas".

Distilling and filtering

A common property of the vodkas produced in the United States and Europe is the extensive use of filtration before any additional processing including the addition of flavorants. Filtering is sometimes done in the still during distillation, as well as afterward, where the distilled vodka is filtered through activated charcoal and other media to absorb trace amounts of substances that alter or impart off-flavors to the vodka. However, this is not the case in the traditional vodka-producing nations, so many distillers from these countries prefer to use very accurate distillation but minimal filtering, thus preserving the unique flavors and characteristics of their products.

The master distiller is in charge of distilling the vodka and directing its filtration, which includes the removal of the "fore-shots", "heads" and "tails". These components of the distillate contain flavor compounds such as ethyl acetate and ethyl lactate (heads) as well as the fusel oils (tails) that impact the usually desired clean taste of vodka. Through numerous rounds of distillation, or the use of a fractioning still, the taste is modified and clarity is increased. In contrast, the distillery process for liquors such as whiskey, rum, and baijiu allow portions of the "heads" and "tails" to remain, giving them their unique flavors.

Repeated distillation of vodka will make its ethanol level much higher than is acceptable to most end users, whether legislation determines strength limits or not. Depending on the distillation method and the technique of the still master, the final filtered and distilled vodka may have as much as 95–96% ethanol. As such, most vodka is diluted with water before bottling.

Flavoring

While most vodkas are unflavored, many flavored vodkas have been produced in traditional vodka-drinking areas, often as home-made recipes to improve vodka's taste or for medicinal purposes. Flavorings include red pepper, ginger, fruit flavors, vanilla, chocolate (without sweetener), and cinnamon. In Russia, vodka flavored with honey and pepper, pertsovka in Russian, is also very popular. In Poland and Belarus, the leaves of the local bison grass are added to produce żubrówka (Polish) and zubrovka (Belarusian) vodka, with slightly sweet flavors and light amber colors. In Lithuania and Poland, a famous vodka containing honey is called krupnik.

This tradition of flavoring is also prevalent in the Nordic countries, where vodka seasoned with herbs, fruits, and spices is the appropriate strong drink for several seasonal festivities. Sweden has forty-odd common varieties of herb-flavored vodka (kryddat brännvin). In Poland and Ukraine, a separate category ( in Ukraine and nalewka in Poland) is used for vodka-based spirits with fruit, root, flower, or herb extracts, which are often home-made or produced by small commercial distilleries. Their alcohol contents vary between 15 and 75%. In Estonia, vodkas are available with barberry, blackcurrant, cherry, green apple, lemon, vanilla, and watermelon flavors.

In most cases, vodka flavoring comes from a post-distillation infusion of flavors. Through the fermentation process, grain mash is transformed into a neutral alcohol beverage that is unflavored. The process of flavoring vodka so that it tastes like fruits, chocolate, and other foods occurs after fermentation and distillation. Various chemicals that reproduce the flavor profiles of foods are added into vodka to give it a specific taste.

Today
Vodka is less likely than other spirits to produce the undesirable after-effects of heavy consumption
(though no less likely to intoxicate) because of its low level of fusel oils and congeners, which are impurities that flavor spirits.

Since the year 2000, because of evolving consumer tastes and regulatory changes, several 'artisanal vodka' or even 'ultra premium vodka' brands have appeared.

European Union regulation
The success of grape-based vodka in the United States in the early twenty-first century prompted traditional vodka producers in the Vodka Belt countries of Poland, Finland, Estonia, Lithuania, and Sweden to campaign for EU legislation that would define vodka as only spirits made from grain or potatoes. This proposition provoked heavy criticism from South European countries, which often distill used mash from wine-making into spirits; although higher-quality mash is usually distilled into some variety of pomace brandy, the lower-quality mash is better turned into neutral-flavored spirits instead. Any vodka not made from either grain or potatoes would have to display the products used in its production. This regulation entered into force in 2008.

Canadian regulations
Under Canadian regulations, Vodka is a potable alcoholic distillate obtained from potatoes, cereal grain or any other material of agricultural origin fermented by the action of yeast or a mixture of yeast and other micro-organisms.

United States regulations

As of 2020, vodka can contain up to two grams per liter of sugar and up to one gram per liter of citric acid according to the Code of Federal Regulations (27 CFR 5.22), which define the identity standards for various alcohols. It is no longer defined as "to be without distinctive character, aroma, taste, or color." The law includes other requirements: Vodka cannot be aged in wood; it may or may not be charcoal filtered; and it must meet minimum distillation and bottling proofs.

Boycotts 
In summer 2013, American LGBT rights activists targeted Russian vodka brands for boycott over Russia's anti-gay policies.

In late February 2022, with the Russian invasion of Ukraine, some North American liquor stores and bars expressed symbolic solidarity with Ukraine, and opposition to Russia, by boycotting Russian vodka brands.

One critic argued that boycotts of Russian-branded vodka may inadvertently affect U.S. vodka manufacturers and noted that only 1.2 percent of U.S. vodka imports come from Russia.

Illegal production
In some countries, black-market or "bathtub" vodka is widespread because it can be produced easily and avoids taxation. However, severe poisoning, blindness, or death can occur as a result of dangerous industrial ethanol substitutes being added by black-market producers. In March 2007 in a documentary, BBC News UK sought to find the cause of severe jaundice among imbibers of a "bathtub" vodka in Russia. The cause was suspected to be an industrial disinfectant (Extrasept)—95% ethanol but also containing a highly toxic chemical—added to the vodka by the illegal traders because of its high alcohol content and low price. Death toll estimates list at least 120 dead and more than 1,000 poisoned. The death toll is expected to rise due to the chronic nature of the cirrhosis that is causing jaundice.

Public health effects

Estimates of the annual death toll resulting from vodka consumption extend up to the thousands in Russia.

Cooking 

Vodka can also be used in cooking and various recipes are improved by the addition of vodka or rely on it as a key ingredient. Vodka sauce is a pasta sauce made from tomato sauce, cream, and vodka that gained popularity in the 1970s. Vodka can be used in baking as a substitute for water: pie crusts can be made flakier with vodka. It may be used in seafood dishes, cheesecake, or bitters.

See also
List of cocktails with vodka
List of vodkas
Vodka sauce
Vodka war

References

Further reading

External links
History in a Vodka Bottle: How Baczewski Ruled European Royal Courts, Invented Marketing & Rose from the Ashes

 
Polish inventions
Russian inventions
Swedish inventions